Amy Jadesimi (born 1976) is a Nigerian businesswoman and the chief executive officer of the Lagos Deep Offshore Logistics Base (LADOL), a privately owned  logistics and engineering facility in the Port of Lagos, Nigeria.

Background and education
Amy Jadesimi was born in Nigeria in 1976. Her father is Chief Oladipo Jadesimi, the executive chairman of LADOL. Her mother, Alero Okotie-Eboh, was a former broadcaster who became a full-time homemaker. Her maternal grandfather, Chief Festus Okotie-Eboh, was a politician who became the Nigerian Minister of Finance.

Jadesimi was educated at Benenden School in the United Kingdom, then at the University of Oxford, where she graduated BA in Physiological Sciences and BMBCh in medicine in 1999. Later, she gained an MBA from the Stanford Graduate School of Business.

Jadesimi is a half-sister of Emma McQuiston, a fashion model who is now Marchioness of Bath.

Career
After medical school, she was recruited by Goldman Sachs. Jadesimi started work in the Investment Banking division of the firm, based in their offices in London, focusing on mergers, acquisitions and corporate finance. She worked there for three years. Even though Jadesimi is better known as a businesswoman, she never intended to leave the medical field and pursue another career. She was offered a job by Goldman Sachs while working with a firm in Oxford. After working there for three years, she never went back to the hospital or her previous job and instead went on to pursue an MBA at Stanford.

Following graduation from Stanford University, she interned for one year at Brait SE in Johannesburg, South Africa, where she worked in the private equity division, as a transaction executive. In 2004, she relocated back to her homeland and joined LADOL, the logistics firm that her father started in 2001. Over time, she rose through the ranks and in 2009, she was appointed by the board as the Chief Executive Officer of the business. Through LADOL, Jadesimi joined the Venture Strategies for Health and Development (VSHD) organization where she works with others Nigerian doctors and birth attendants to reduce the high rate of maternal mortality in Nigeria. Upon addressing the many cases, Jadesimi and other practitioners noticed that the drugs used to help reduce the maternal mortality were expensive; therefore, not many pregnant women could afford them. The VSHD came up with a drug that was well suited for maternal mortality and was better for the market. Under Jadesimi's supervision, the organization partnered with a leading pharmaceutical company in Nigeria, Emzor Pharmaceuticals, to distribute the drugs through Nigeria. Beyond LADOL, she is on the Prince's Trust International global advisory board, a founding commissioner of the Business and Sustainable Development and Commission and a Forbes contributor.

Featured as a guest panelist at the London Business School African summit, speaking on integration and growth on the continent, parallel to the events Jadesimi took part initialing an art collaboration piece called Remember To Rise.

Honors and awards
In 2012, Jadesimi was named an Archbishop Desmond Tutu Fellow. In 2013, she was named as a Young Global Leader by the World Economic Forum. Also that year she was given the title of Rising Talent by the Women's Forum for the Economy and Society. Forbes included her in the 2014 20 Youngest Power Women in Africa article. The Financial Times named her one of the top 25 Africans To Watch. Dr Jadesimi was recognized as one of the Global Top 100 Most Influential People of African Descent in support of the United Nations International Decade for People of African Descent

See also
 Economy of Nigeria
 Lagos State

References

External links
Website of Lagos Deep Offshore Logistics Base
Oil was not her first choice. Now she's an industry boss

1976 births
Living people
Businesspeople from Lagos
Alumni of the University of Oxford
Amy
Stanford University alumni
Nigerian businesspeople
Nigerian businesspeople in the oil industry
Nigerian women in business
Nigerian business executives
Nigerian women business executives
Itsekiri people
Yoruba women in business
Nigerian women medical doctors
Nigerian chief executives
Yoruba women physicians
People educated at Benenden School